Valdragone is a village (curazia) in central San Marino. It belongs to the castello of Borgo Maggiore.

Geography
The village is divided into two areas: Valdragone di Sopra (Upper V.) and Valdragone di Sotto (Lower V.). It is situated close at the east of Borgo Maggiore and also close to Cailungo and Domagnano.

History
The name of Valdragone appears for the first time in historical documents of 1253. The Monastero di Santa Chiara was built from 1969 to 1971.

According to legend, the name "Valdragone" comes from stories of a dragon that appeared there. From Italian val, apocopic form of valle ("valley") + dragone ("dragon").

See also
Borgo Maggiore
Cà Melone
Cà Rigo
Cailungo
San Giovanni sotto le Penne
Ventoso

References

Curazie in San Marino
Borgo Maggiore